French Hospital may refer to:

in Argentina
French Hospital, Buenos Aires, near the Plaza Miserere (Buenos Aires Metro)

in England
French Convalescent Home, Brighton, which received patients from the French Hospital in London
French Hospital (La Providence), formerly in London; now located in Rochester, Kent, it provides almshouse accommodation for Huguenot descendants

in France
Hôtel-Dieu, ("hostel of God"), the old name given to the principal hospital in French towns
List of hospitals in France

in Hong Kong
St Teresa's Hospital, Hong Kong in Kowloon, also known as the "French Hospital" 
St. Paul's Hospital (Hong Kong) in Hong Kong Island, also known as the "French Hospital" 

in the United States
Peter Claver Building, New Orleans, Louisiana, known historically as the "French Hospital"
French Hospital (Manhattan) was a hospital established in 1881 and closed in 1977
San Francisco French Hospital, now known as the French Campus of the Kaiser San Francisco Medical Center

in Vietnam
L'Hôpital Français De Hanoï, also known as the French Hospital of Hanoi

See also
List of hospitals in France